The Monk and the Demon is a 2016 Russian comedy film directed by Nikolay Dostal. It is inspired by the life of Ilya (Archbishop of Novgorod).

Plot
Fantastic story of the first half of the 19th century. In the monastery there is a new resident Ivan. But along with the monk, dark forces penetrate the monastery, which materialize in the person of the Legion (as he introduced himself to Ivan). The Legion chose Ivan as the object of his diabolical work, tempting him in every possible way in order to knock off his chosen way of serving God. But the stronger the temptation, the stronger the spiritual strength of Ivan.

Cast 
 Timofey Tribuntsev as Ivan the monk
 Boris Kamorzin as Hegumen of the monastery
 Nikita Tarasov as Nicholas I
 Sergey Barkovsky as Alexander von Benckendorff
 Roman Madyanov as bishop

Awards
 Golden Eagle Award for    Best Screenplay (Yuri Arabov)
 Nika Award for   Best Screenplay  (Yuri Arabov), for  Best Actor (Timofey Tribuntsev),  for Best Supporting Actor (Boris Kamorzin),  for  Best Sound (Maxim Belovolov)

References

External links 

Russian comedy-drama films
2016 comedy-drama films
Films about Orthodoxy
Cultural depictions of Nicholas I of Russia
Films set in the 19th century
Films set in monasteries